Manal Yunis (born 1929) is an Iraqi women's leader. She was among the leading figures of the Ba'ath Party during the rule of Saddam Hussein.

Biography
A lawyer from Baghdad, Manal Yunis joined the Ba'ath Party in 1962. In 1969 she helped found the General Federation of Iraqi Women (GFIW), and she served in several different Ba'ath Party posts.

Saddam Hussein appointed her to head the GFIW in 1979. After Saddam was toppled from power, she was rumoured to have fled Iraq in August 2003.

References

1929 births
Living people
Iraqi women's rights activists
20th-century Iraqi lawyers
Politicians from Baghdad
Ba'ath Party politicians
20th-century Iraqi women politicians
20th-century Iraqi politicians